"Dirty Creature" is a song by New Zealand art rock group Split Enz. It was released in March 1982 as the lead single from their eighth studio album Time and Tide.

Tim Finn had been suffering from panic attacks at the time, and co-wrote the song as a relief for his condition.

Track listing
"Dirty Creature" 4:02
"Make Sense of It" 3:40

Personnel 
 Tim Finn – vocals, piano
 Neil Finn – vocals, guitar
 Noel Crombie – drums, percussion
 Nigel Griggs – bass
 Eddie Rayner – percussion, keyboards

Charts

Weekly charts

Year-end charts

References

Split Enz songs
1982 singles
Songs written by Tim Finn
Songs written by Neil Finn
Mushroom Records singles
1982 songs